Half of Heaven is a 1986 Spanish drama film directed by Manuel Gutiérrez Aragón. The film was selected as the Spanish entry for the Best Foreign Language Film at the 59th Academy Awards, but was not accepted as a nominee.

Cast

Release 
The film was theatrically released in Spain on 9 October 1986, grossing 207 million ₧ (681,393 admissions) in the domestic market.

Accolades 

|-
| rowspan = "2" align = "center" | 1986 || rowspan = "2" | 34th San Sebastián International Film Festival || colspan = "2" | Golden Shell ||  || rowspan = "2" | 
|-
| Silver Shell for Best Actress || Ángela Molina || 
|-
| rowspan = "5" | 1987 || rowspan = "5" | 1st Goya Awards || colspan = "2" | Best Film ||  || rowspan = "5" | 
|-
| Best Actress || Ángela Molina || 
|-
| Best Cinematography || José Luis Alcaine || 
|-
| Best Music || Milladoiro || 
|-
| Best Costume Design || Gerardo Vera || 
|}

See also
 List of Spanish films of 1986
 List of submissions to the 59th Academy Awards for Best Foreign Language Film
 List of Spanish submissions for the Academy Award for Best Foreign Language Film

References

External links
 

1986 films
1986 drama films
Spanish drama films
1980s Spanish-language films
Films directed by Manuel Gutiérrez Aragón
1980s Spanish films